A Gurkha memorial is slated to be unveiled in Aldershot in September 2021. The bronze sculpture of Kulbir Thapa Magar will be installed in Princes Gardens.

References

War memorials in Aldershot
Bronze sculptures in the United Kingdom
Gurkhas
Monuments and memorials in the United Kingdom
Sculptures of men in the United Kingdom
Statues in the United Kingdom